The wrynecks (genus Jynx) are a small but distinctive group of small Old World woodpeckers. Jynx  is from the Ancient Greek iunx, the Eurasian wryneck.

These birds get their English name from their ability to turn their heads almost 180°. When disturbed at the nest, they use this snake-like head twisting and hissing as a threat display. It has occasionally been called "snake-bird" for that reason.

Like the true woodpeckers, wrynecks have large heads, long tongues, which they use to extract their insect prey, and zygodactyl feet, with two toes pointing forward and two backwards,but they lack the stiff tail feathers that the true woodpeckers use when climbing trees, so they are more likely than their relatives to perch on a branch rather than an upright trunk. Wryneck's (Jynginae) sexes are similar. 

Their bills are shorter and less dagger-like than in the true woodpeckers, but their chief prey is ants and other insects, which they find in decaying wood or almost bare soil. They reuse woodpecker holes for nesting, rather than making their own holes. The eggs are white, as with many hole nesters.

The two species have cryptic plumage, with intricate patterning of greys and browns. The adult moults rapidly between July and September, although some moult continues in its winter quarters. The voice is a nasal woodpecker-like call. Its sound is described as a repetition of the sounds que, que, que, many times in succession, rapid at first, but gradually slowing and in a continually falling key. This is only heard during a few weeks of its stay in Europe.

Taxonomy
The genus Jynx was introduced in 1758 by Swedish naturalist Carl Linnaeus in the 10th edition of his Systema Naturae. Linnaeus placed a single species in the genus, the Eurasian wryneck (Jynx torquilla), which is therefore the type species. The genus name is from the Ancient Greek word ιυγξ/iunx for the Eurasian wryneck.

Species
The genus contains two species:

References

External links

 Ageing and sexing (PDF; 4.6 MB) by Javier Blasco-Zumeta & Gerd-Michael Heinze

Picidae